Park Je-un  (born 11 March 1993) is a South Korean Nordic combined skier who competes internationally.

He competed at the 2018 Winter Olympics.

References

External links

1993 births
Living people
South Korean male Nordic combined skiers
Olympic Nordic combined skiers of South Korea
Nordic combined skiers at the 2018 Winter Olympics
Nordic combined skiers at the 2022 Winter Olympics
South Korean male ski jumpers
Olympic ski jumpers of South Korea
Ski jumpers at the 2018 Winter Olympics
Competitors at the 2015 Winter Universiade
21st-century South Korean people